Malcolm Winters is a fictional character from the American CBS soap opera, The Young and the Restless. Originally and most recently portrayed by Shemar Moore, Darius McCrary took over between December 29, 2009, and October 17, 2011. Moore reprised the role for guest appearances in September 2014 and April 2019.

Malcolm is the half-brother of longtime character, Neil Winters (Kristoff St. John). His history includes getting Neil's wife, Drucilla Winters, pregnant, as well as other conflicts with his brother, his history as a photographer, and marriages to Olivia Winters and Sofia Dupre. In March 2019, it was announced that Moore would reprise the role of Malcolm Winters for a two-episode stint, following St. John's passing the month before.

Casting
The role was originated by Shemar Moore on May 5, 1994, who received a Daytime Emmy Award for Outstanding Supporting Actor in a Drama Series for his portrayal in 2000, with nominations for Outstanding Younger Actor in 1996 and 1997. After much speculation that Moore would exit the soap opera in 2000, he confirmed that he would depart at the end of his contract in the spring of 2001. However, in February 2001, Moore announced that he had extended his contract through the end of that year. In December, he announced he was leaving The Young and the Restless, and last aired on February 14, 2002. In September 2004, after a two-year absence, Moore was announced to reprise the role. Of Moore's return, former co-head writer John F. Smith stated: "We are thrilled to have Shemar back with us. His story will be something very unexpected, off the page, and exciting. The man is going to have impact." Moore made his return on November 1, 2004. However, within weeks, Moore's publicist revealed that his return would be short-lived, as he had only signed a six-month contract. The publicist stated: "He's auditioning now [for other projects] and he has two or three films coming out next year. You know how this industry is. At least [The Young and the Restless will] have him for six months." Moore made his final appearance as the character on September 1, 2005.

In September 2009, it was announced that the soap opera had put out a casting call for the role of Malcolm. In November, Darius McCrary was announced to be joining the cast, in his first daytime television role, with his first appearance on December 29, 2009. In September 2011, it was announced that McCrary had been let go from The Young and the Restless. He made his final appearance on October 17, 2011. On July 23, 2014, CBS Daytime announced that Moore would reprise the role of Malcolm for a two-episode guest stint starting on September 10, 2014. In March 2019, it was announced that Moore would return for another two-episode guest stint, following the death of Kristoff St. John.

Storylines

1994–2002, 2004–05
Malcolm first arrives in Genoa City in 1994, determined to rebuild his relationship with his estranged half-brother, Neil Winters. Neil, at first, wants nothing to do with his rebellious younger half-brother, but eventually decides to give him a second chance. With the help of Blade Bladeson, Malcolm became Genoa City's most prominent photographer.

He develops a friendship with Neil's wife Drucilla Barber, and is instantly smitten with her, but nothing becomes of it. However, Malcolm later discovers Drucilla after she has taken a good dose of cold medication, and thus mistakes Malcolm for Neil. After Drucilla calls out for Neil, making Malcolm realize her advances were not intended for him, Malcolm chooses to rape her. The following morning, Malcolm realizes what a mistake he has made and confides his crime to Dru's sister, Olivia.

Nine months later, Drucilla gives birth to a daughter, Lily Winters. Having convinced herself that Neil is Lily's father, Dru forgives Malcolm and Olivia soon fixes him up with her hospital colleague, Keesha Monroe. They fall in love and marry, just before Keesha dies of AIDS.

Malcolm then develops a relationship with recently widowed Olivia and grows very attached to her son Nathan Hastings, Jr. Malcolm and Olivia marry in 1997. One year later, Malcolm's ex-girlfriend Callie Rogers arrives in town and Olivia becomes jealous that Malcolm is spending so much time with her. Olivia's insecurity ultimately destroys her marriage to Malcolm and he rebounds back to Callie. The two become engaged but Callie soon breaks it off and leaves town. In the meantime, Malcolm continues his close relationship with his former stepson Nate, who views Malcolm as his father.

Malcolm and Neil soon find themselves fighting over a woman, attorney Alex Perez. Malcolm and Alex fall in love and become engaged, though she is also developing feelings for Neil. While the three of them are on business in Kenya, Malcolm mistakingly overhears Alex confess her feelings to Neil and leaves. While driving over a bridge, on the way to a photo shoot, the bridge collapses and Malcolm is presumed dead.

Malcolm returns to town two years later resenting Neil, believing he purposely did not do enough to rescue him in Kenya, so that he could have Alex for himself. Eventually the two bury the hatchet. While in town, Malcolm briefly has a fling with Adrienne Markham, Damon Porter's ex-wife.

Malcolm then demands that Dru take a paternity test to determine once and for all if he is Lily's biological father. When Malcolm is proven to be Lily's father, he and Dru decide to keep it a secret and he leaves town. While Malcolm is gone, Lily and Neil discover the truth about her paternity, but are unable to contact him.

2009–11
Four years later, Malcolm returned to Genoa City while secretly working undercover as a corporate spy for Tucker McCall. He learns that Lily had been diagnosed with ovarian cancer and attempted to support her while clashing with Neil. However, the two eventually put aside their differences and reconnected as brothers. Malcolm took a job as a photographer at Restless Style magazine and hired his adopted nephew, Devon Hamilton, as his assistant. Months after Malcolm mentioned he was engaged, his fiancée, Sofia Dupre, arrived in town. She worked for Tucker and had a business clash with Neil, and they ended up having a one-night stand and not telling Malcolm to act like it never happened. Malcolm and Sofia were married soon after.

Sofia is later found out to be pregnant, though the paternity of the baby was left undetermined. While pregnant, Sofia was forced to tell Malcolm the truth about her night with Neil, and that she wasn't sure of the paternity of the baby. Sofia gave birth to a boy named Moses Winters, after her father. Afterward, a paternity test showed that Neil is Moses's father. Devastated, Malcolm had to make a decision about his future with Moses, and visited Sofia in the hospital and asked her to sign divorce papers and tells her that he will be moving away, even though Sofia wanted to work out their marriage. Malcolm said goodbye to Genoa City and headed for the airport.

2014
In September 2014, Malcolm returned to Genoa City, planning to overcome his differences with Neil, and help him cope with his sudden blindness. The two re-establish their relationship as brothers and Malcolm heads off to his next photo shoot.

2019
After Neil's sudden death, Malcolm returns to Genoa City to be with the family. At Neil's funeral, Malcolm gives a tearful and emotional eulogy stating that while his relationship with his brother wasn't always perfect, he always had an unconditional love and admiration for him. He thanks Neil for all he's done for him and given him. After comforting everyone at the house, Malcolm heads back on the road, promising to stay in touch.

References

The Young and the Restless characters
Television characters introduced in 1994
Fictional African-American people
Fictional photographers
Fictional rapists
American male characters in television